Mills Peak is a sharp peak in the Deep Freeze Range of Victoria Land, Antarctica. It rises to  along the west side of Campbell Glacier between Mount Queensland and the terminus of Bates Glacier. Mills Peak was mapped by the United States Geological Survey from surveys and U.S. Navy air photos, 1955–63, and was named by the Advisory Committee on Antarctic Names for Peter J. Mills, a geologist at McMurdo Station in the 1965–66 season.

References

Mountains of Victoria Land
Scott Coast